Tim Smyczek was the defending champion, but lost in the semifinals to Kyle Edmund.

Kyle Edmund went on to win the title, defeating Daniel Evans in the final 6–3, 6–2.

Seeds

Draw

Finals

Top half

Bottom half

References
 Main Draw
 Qualifying Draw

RBC Tennis Championships of Dallas - Singles
2016 Singles